Chang Hao (born November 7, 1976 in Shanghai) is a professional Go player. He is a 9 dan Go player from China. He is China's best player of the 1990s and one of the best in the world. Growing up he was a prodigy in China, he has won many titles, including three international champions. He is the best friend of Lee Chang-ho, whom he most recently defeated in the final of the 7th Chunlan Cup. Some of his hobbies include playing football, swimming, and traveling. He is married to Zhang Xuan, who is also a Go player.

Titles and runners-up
 
Ranks #3 in the total number of titles in China.

References

1976 births
Living people
Go players from Shanghai
Asian Games medalists in go
Go players at the 2010 Asian Games
Asian Games silver medalists for China
Medalists at the 2010 Asian Games